Red Bull Culture Clash is an indoor sound clash event hosted by Red Bull.

Four crews compete in four or five rounds of genre-bending musical competition, with the winner decided by volume of crowd response. Founded in 2010, with a hiatus in 2015, the event is billed as "the world's biggest musical battle." In 2014, the event was attended by 20,000 people, with 30,000 anticipated in 2016.

Crews
2010 - February: Metalheadz (winners), Soul II Soul, Trojan Soundsystem, Digital Mystikz.
2010 - October: Metalheadz, Skream and Benga, Soul Jazz, Channel One (winners).
2012: Channel One, Major Lazer, Boy Better Know (winners), Annie Mac (ft Magnetic Man, Redlight, Disclosure and Rudimental)
2013 [New York]: Just Blaze & Young Guru, Federation Sound, Que Bajo?!, Trouble & Bass (winners)
2014: Rebel Sound (Chase & Status, David Rodigan, Shy FX and MC Rage) (winners), Boy Better Know, A$AP Mob, Stone Love Movement
2016: Mixpak (winners), Wiz Khalifa & Taylor Gang, UKG Allstars, Eskimo Dance (Grime acts hosted by Wiley)
2017: [Atlanta]: Eardrummers ft. Mike Will Made-It, Unruly (winners), Disturbing London ft. Tinie Tempah, Enjoylife ft. Wondagurl
2018: [Berlin]: Jugglerz, Betty Ford Boys, Die Achse, Revolution No 5

References

External links 
 Official site
 Fact Mag
 Fact Mag
 How Trouble & Bass Won Red Bull Culture Clash

Culture Clash
Music competitions in the United Kingdom